The Los Angeles Rams Cheerleaders are the official National Football League cheerleading squad representing the Los Angeles Rams.

History
They were established in 1974 during the team's original tenure in Los Angeles and were known as the Embraceable Ewes. The cheerleading organization became known as the "St. Louis Rams Cheerleaders" when the team moved to St. Louis, Missouri. Beginning with the 2016 NFL season, the organization changed their name to the "Los Angeles Rams Cheerleaders" to associate themselves with the recently relocated Los Angeles Rams football team.

Notable members
Lisa Guerrero (1983–1987), American sports broadcaster, actress, model
Apollonia Kotero (1980s), co-star of Purple Rain.  Former girlfriend of Prince, and lead singer of Apollonia 6.
Jenilee Harrison (1978–1980), actress, Three's Company

References

External links

Los Angeles Rams Cheerleaders Official Website

Performing groups established in 1974
Los Angeles Rams
1974 establishments in California
National Football League cheerleading squads
Los Angeles Rams personnel